is a former Japanese football player.

Playing career
Tomita was born in Ube on April 24, 1977. After graduating from University of Tsukuba, he joined newly was promoted to J2 League club, Mito HollyHock in 2000. He became a regular player as defensive midfielder from first season. He was converted to center back in 2001. In 2004, he moved to J2 club Omiya Ardija. He played as regular center back. Ardija won the 2nd place and was promoted to J1 League first time in the club history. He played more 30 matches every season until 2008. In 2010, he moved to Vissel Kobe. However he could hardly play in the match. In 2011, he moved to Ventforet Kofu. However the club was relegated to J2 end of 2011 season and he could not play many matches in 2012. In 2013, he re-joined Mito HollyHock for the first time in 10 years. He played as regular center back in 2013. However his opportunity to play decreased in 2014. In 2015, he moved to Tokushima Vortis. Although he could not play at all in the match until 2016, he could hardly play in the match in 2017. In 2018, he re-joined Mito HollyHock. However he could hardly play in the match and retired end of 2018 season.

Club statistics

References

External links

1977 births
Living people
University of Tsukuba alumni
Association football people from Yamaguchi Prefecture
Japanese footballers
J1 League players
J2 League players
Mito HollyHock players
Omiya Ardija players
Vissel Kobe players
Ventforet Kofu players
Tokushima Vortis players
Association football defenders